Dennis William Hull (born November 19, 1944) is a Canadian former professional ice hockey left winger who played most of his career for the Chicago Black Hawks of the National Hockey League.  He is the brother of Bobby Hull and uncle of Brett Hull and Bart Hull.

Career

As a player, he was in the shadow of his older brother Bobby Hull, where they were both teammates on the Chicago Black Hawks for eight seasons.

Dennis emerged as a star player on his own, scoring over 300 goals in his own right, and earning the nickname "the Silver Jet" (Bobby was known as "the Golden Jet").

When Bobby was excluded from the 1972 Summit Series because he played in the WHA, Dennis initially planned to boycott the event as well as a show of support for his brother, but Bobby persuaded him to stay on Team Canada. During the series, Hull took over for Vic Hadfield at the left wing position on the New York Rangers "Goal A Game" line with Jean Ratelle and Rod Gilbert, managing two goals and two assists in four games.

He was named a Second Team All-Star and played in five NHL All-Star Games. His best years were as part of the "MPH" (pun on 'miles per hour' using each player's last initials) line with centre Pit Martin and right wing Jim Pappin.  The line was considered one of the better units in the NHL in the early to mid-1970s. He recorded seasons of 40, 30, 39 and 29 goals from 1971 through 1974.  His best season was in 1973 when he recorded 39 goals and 51 assists for 90 points.  He was instrumental in Chicago's appearance in the Stanley Cup Finals that season. Hull led the team with 9 goals and 15 assists for 24 points, finishing second in playoff scoring that season.

He played 14 seasons in the National Hockey League, with the Chicago Black Hawks (1964–77) and Detroit Red Wings (1977–78).

After Hockey
Upon retirement as a player, Hull became a broadcaster, as well as an educator, returning to St. Catharines, Ontario, where he played Ontario Hockey League Junior hockey (St. Catharines Teepees 1960–64), to study at Brock University, graduating with a degree in History and Physical Education. He then taught at Ridley College and then became athletic director of the Illinois Institute of Technology in Chicago.

Recently, Hull has been noted as a public speaker and comedian, and continues to operate a cattle farm raising Polled Hereford with his brother Gary in Northumberland County, Ontario.  He has written a book entitled "The Third Best Hull" (ECW Press) which contains entertaining and often hilarious memoirs of his hockey career. Hull became good friends with Soviet goaltending legend Vladislav Tretiak, whom he had played against during the 1972 Summit Series, recalling "I told Tretiak that he's become famous for letting in [Henderson's] goal...I said to him that 'if you had stopped it, you'd probably be a cab driver in Moscow today.' "

Accomplishments and awards
OHA-Jr. First All-Star Team (1964)
NHL Second All-Star Team (1973)
Played in NHL All-Star Game (1969, 1971, 1972, 1973, 1974)

Career statistics

Regular season and playoffs

International

References

Further reading

External links
 

1944 births
Living people
Brock University alumni
Canadian ice hockey left wingers
Chicago Blackhawks players
Detroit Red Wings players
National Hockey League All-Stars
St. Catharines Black Hawks players
St. Catharines Teepees players
Ice hockey people from Ontario
Sportspeople from Belleville, Ontario
San Jose Sharks announcers